The Underground Great Wall of China (
) is the informal name for the vast system of tunnels China uses to store and transport mobile intercontinental ballistic missiles.

Description 
Due to the great secrecy surrounding the tunnels, not much information about them is publicly available; however, it is believed that the tunnels allow for mobile ICBMs to be shuttled around to different silos, and possibly stored in reinforced underground bunkers. This greatly enhances the ICBM's chance of survival in a direct nuclear strike, which enables their use in a second strike unlike ICBMs based in static nuclear silos which are susceptible to a direct nuclear attack.

A report written by a Georgetown University team led by Phillip Karber conducted a three-year study mapping out China's complex tunnel system, which stretches 5,000 km (3,000 miles). The report determined that the size of the Chinese nuclear arsenal is understated and as many as 3,000 nuclear warheads may be stored in the tunnel network. This hypothetical maximum storage or basing capacity along with Karber's own misconceived fissile production suggestions,  resulted in Western media purporting that 3,000 warheads were actually in the facility. The Karber study went on to state that the tunnels are not likely to be breached by conventional or low-yield earth-penetrating nuclear weapons such as the B61-11.

See also 
 816 Nuclear Military Plant
 Iranian underground missile bases

References

External links 
 Strategic implications of China's Underground Great Wall, Karber 2011.Hosted by FAS.PDF

Military installations of China